Rikava Manor is a manor in Rikava Parish, Rēzekne Municipality in the historical region of Latgale, in Latvia. The complex includes a castle, park and three other  buildings.

History 
Rikava estate was property of Janovski noble family. In the second half of the 18th century Mihals von Rick bought estate. The red brick manor house in Neo Gothic style was built from 1870 to 1875.
After Latvian agrarian reform of 1920s manor was  property of the state and since 1926 manor house hosted Rikava Elementary School, which still operates today. Beautiful building interior and wooden stairs are well preserved.

See also
List of palaces and manor houses in Latvia

References

Manor houses in Latvia